The 2016 season was AIK's 125th in existence, their 88th season in Allsvenskan and their 11th consecutive season in the league. The team competed in Allsvenskan, Svenska Cupen and UEFA Europa League.

Season events
Prior to the start of the season, AIK announced the signing of Daniel Sundgren from Degerfors on a contract until the end of 2019, the return of Eero Markkanen on a contract until the end of 2018.

On 4 January, AIK announced the singing of Denni Avdić from AZ Alkmaar to a three-year contract. The following day, 5 January, Amin Affane joined AIK from Arminia Bielefeld.

On 7 January, AIK announced the signing of Ahmed Yasin from AGF on a two-year contract.

On 4 August, AIK announced the singing of free-agent Chinedu Obasi to a short-term contract. Five days later, 11 August, AIK announced the signing of John Chibuike from Gaziantepspor until the end of the season.

Squad

Transfers

In

Loans in

Out

Loans out

Released

Friendlies

Competitions

Overview

Allsvenskan

League table

Results summary

Results by round

Results

Svenska Cupen

2015–16

Group stage

Knockout phase

2016–17

UEFA Europa League

Qualifying rounds

Squad statistics

Appearances and goals

|-
|colspan="16"|Players away on loan:

|-
|colspan="16"|Players who appeared for AIK but left during the season:

|}

Goal scorers

Clean sheets

Disciplinary record

References

AIK Fotboll season
AIK Fotboll seasons